San Martino al Vento is a village in Tuscany, central Italy, administratively a frazione of the comune of Gaiole in Chianti, province of Siena. At the time of the 2001 census its population was 41.

San Martino al Vento is about 28 km from Siena and 6 km from Gaiole in Chianti.

References 

Frazioni of Gaiole in Chianti